Rugby in the United States may refer to:
                                      
Rugby union in the United States
Rugby league in the United States